Manchester is a city in Northwest England.  The M14 postcode area is to the south of the city centre, and contains the areas of Fallowfield, Moss Side, and Rusholme.  The postcode area contains 59 listed buildings that are recorded in the National Heritage List for England.  Of these, one is listed at Grade I, the highest of the three grades, three are at Grade II*, the middle grade, and the others are at Grade II, the lowest grade.

The postcode area is largely residential, and most of the listed buildings are houses, or originated as houses, and were later converted into other uses.  Many of the large houses date from the middle and later part of the 19th century, and this reflects the commercial prosperity of the city at that time.  In the area are colleges and halls of residence for university students, and some of the large houses have been converted for these purposes.  The other listed buildings include churches, public houses and hotels, and a war memorial.


Key

Buildings

References

Citations

Sources

Lists of listed buildings in Greater Manchester
Buildings and structures in Manchester